Pauline Collins  (born 3 September 1940) is a British actress who first came to prominence portraying Sarah Moffat in Upstairs, Downstairs (1971–1973) and its spin-off Thomas & Sarah (1979). In 1992, she published her autobiography Letter to Louise.

Collins played the title role in the play Shirley Valentine for which she won the Laurence Olivier Award for Best Actress, and the Tony Award for Best Actress in a Play. She reprised the role in the 1989 film adaptation of the play, winning the BAFTA Award for Best Actress in a Leading Role and receiving a nomination for the Academy Award for Best Actress. She also starred in the television dramas  Forever Green (1989–1992) and The Ambassador (1998–1999). Her other film appearances include City of Joy (1992), Paradise Road (1997), Albert Nobbs (2011), Quartet (2012), and The Time of Their Lives (2017).

Early life and career
Collins was born in Exmouth, Devon, the daughter of Mary Honora (née Callanan), a schoolteacher, and William Henry Collins, a school headmaster. She is of Irish extraction, and was brought up as a Catholic in Wallasey, Cheshire. Her great-uncle was Irish poet Jeremiah Joseph Callanan.

Collins was educated at Sacred Heart High School and studied at the Central School of Speech and Drama in London. Before turning to acting, she worked as a teacher until 1962. She made her stage debut at Windsor in A Gazelle in Park Lane in 1962 and her West End debut in Passion Flower Hotel in 1965. During the play's run, she made her first film, titled Secrets of a Windmill Girl, released in 1966. More stage roles followed.

Collins played Samantha Briggs in the 1967 Doctor Who serial The Faceless Ones and was offered the chance to continue in the series as a new companion for the Doctor, but declined the role.

Other early TV credits include the UK's first medical soap Emergency Ward 10 (1960), and the pilot episode and first series of The Liver Birds, both in 1969.

Collins first became well-known for her role as the maid Sarah in the 1970s drama series Upstairs, Downstairs. The character appeared regularly throughout the first two series, the second of which starred her actor husband John Alderton, with whom she later starred in the spin-off Thomas & Sarah (1979); the sitcom No, Honestly, written by Terence Brady and Charlotte Bingham; and a series of short-story adaptations titled Wodehouse Playhouse (1975–1978). She co-narrated the animated British children's TV series Little Miss with Alderton in 1983.

In connection with her role on Upstairs, Downstairs, Collins recorded the 1973 single "What Are We Going to Do with Uncle Arthur?" (performed by her character several times during the series) backed with "With Every Passing Day" (a vocal version of the show's theme).

She was a subject of the television programme This Is Your Life in April 1972, when she was surprised by Eamonn Andrews.

Shirley Valentine and recent years
In 1988, Collins starred in the one-woman play Shirley Valentine in London, reprising the role on Broadway in 1989 and in the 1989 film version. The film won a number of awards and nominations; Collins was nominated for the Oscar as Best Actress and won the Golden Globe for Best Actress in a Comedy or Musical. Both the play and the feature film used the technique known as breaking the fourth wall as the character Shirley Valentine directly addresses the audience throughout the story.

After Shirley Valentine, Collins starred with her husband in the popular ITV drama series Forever Green, created and written by Terence Brady and Charlotte Bingham in which the fictitious couple escape the city with their children to start a new life in the country. It ran from 1989 to 1992 over 18 episodes. Collins was voted sexiest woman in Britain in 1990.

Collins' film credits include 1992's City of Joy, 1995's , 1997's Paradise Road, and 2002's Mrs Caldicot's Cabbage War, which also featured Alderton. In 1999 and 2000, Collins starred as Harriet Smith in the BBC television drama Ambassador. Other television credits include The Saint, The Wednesday Play, Armchair Theatre, Play for Today, Tales of the Unexpected, Country Matters, and The Black Tower.

In 2002, she guest-starred in Man and Boy, the dramatisation of Tony Parsons' best-seller. In 2005, she appeared as Miss Flite in the BBC production of Charles Dickens' Bleak House.

In 2006, she became the third actor to have been in both the original and new series of Doctor Who, appearing in the episode "Tooth and Claw" as Queen Victoria.

Later in 2006, she appeared in Extinct, a programme where eight celebrities campaigned on behalf of an animal to save it from extinction. Collins campaigned to save the Bengal tiger and won the public vote.

In December 2007, she appeared as the fairy godmother in the pantomime Cinderella at the Old Vic in London.

In 2011, she was cast as part of the comedy-drama Mount Pleasant. She played the role of Sue, Lisa's mother, in the first two series running into 2012. She did not return to the third series in 2013, and her character was killed off in the fourth series in 2014.

In late 2015, she appeared as Mrs Gamp in the BBC TV series Dickensian.

Collins was appointed an Officer of the Order of the British Empire in the 2001 Birthday Honours for services to drama.

Personal life
Collins married actor John Alderton in 1969 and lives in Hampstead, London with her husband and their three children Nicholas, Kate, and Richard. She also has an older daughter, Louise, with actor Tony Rohr. Collins gave Louise up for adoption in 1964 when she was a penniless single mother. They were reunited when Louise was 22 years old. Collins's book, Letter To Louise, documents these events.

Filmography

Awards and nominations
Laurence Olivier Award for Best Actress (winner)
Tony Award in 1989 for Best Actress in a Play (winner)
Theatre World Award for Outstanding Broadway Debut (winner)
Drama Desk Award for Outstanding Actress in a Play (winner)
Outer Critics Circle Award for Best Actress (winner)
Academy Award for Best Actress (nominee)
Golden Globe Award for Best Actress, Comedy or Musical (nominee)
BAFTA for Best Film Actress (winner)

References

External links

Pauline Collins images
2001 profile
Article about Collins' receipt of the OBE
Pauline Collins(Aveleyman)

1940 births
Alumni of the Royal Central School of Speech and Drama
Best Actress BAFTA Award winners
Drama Desk Award winners
English film actresses
English people of Irish descent
English Roman Catholics
English stage actresses
English television actresses
Laurence Olivier Award winners
Living people
Officers of the Order of the British Empire
People from Exmouth
Tony Award winners
People educated at Sacred Heart High School, Hammersmith
20th-century English actresses
21st-century English actresses
Actresses from Devon